Trupanea excepta is a species of tephritid or fruit flies in the genus Trupanea of the family Tephritidae.

Distribution
Chile.

References

Tephritinae
Insects described in 1933
Diptera of South America
Taxa named by John Russell Malloch
Endemic fauna of Chile